Mahendran Kannan (born 5 March 1964) is an Indian weightlifter. He competed in the men's flyweight event at the 1984 Summer Olympics.

References

External links
 

1964 births
Living people
Indian male weightlifters
Olympic weightlifters of India
Weightlifters at the 1984 Summer Olympics
Place of birth missing (living people)
20th-century Indian people